Mike Rivera (born January 10, 1986) is a former American football linebacker and tight end. He played college football at Kansas.

Professional career

Chicago Bears 
After going undrafted in the 2009 NFL Draft, Rivera signed with the Chicago Bears as an undrafted free agent on April 26, 2009. He was cut on September 5, 2009.

Tennessee Titans 
On September 7, 2009, the Tennessee Titans signed Rivera to their practice squad. He was signed to a future contract with the Titans after the 2009 season on January 4, 2010. He was waived on August 31, 2010.

Green Bay Packers 
Rivera was signed to the Green Bay Packers' practice squad on October 13, 2010.

Miami Dolphins 
The Miami Dolphins signed Rivera off the Packers' practice squad on December 28, 2010. Rivera was released by the Dolphins in August 2011.

New England Patriots 
The New England Patriots signed Rivera to the practice squad on November 9, 2011. Rivera signed a future contract with the Patriots on February 8, 2012.

Second Stint with Dolphins
The Dolphins signed Rivera on September 25, 2012. He was waived on October 2, 2012.

Second Stint with Patriots
The Patriots signed Rivera on October 31, 2012. He was waived on August 30, 2013.

References

External links
Kansas Jayhawks bio
New England Patriots bio

1986 births
Living people
Sportspeople from Kansas
Players of American football from Kansas
American football linebackers
Kansas Jayhawks football players
Chicago Bears players
Tennessee Titans players
Miami Dolphins players
New England Patriots players
Green Bay Packers players